The Baublys (or Antežeriai Lake) is a lake in Krakės Eldership, Kėdainiai District Municipality, central Lithuania. This is the largest lake of Kėdainiai District Municipality. It belongs to the Šušvė basin (part of the Nevėžis basin).

On the northern coast Antežeriai village is located. The Baublys Lake and its close surroundings (reed beds) are declared an ornithological sanctuary. The nesting places of Eurasian bittern, spotted crake and other water birds are protected here. 

The name Baublys comes from the same Lithuanian word which means 'bittern'.

References

Lakes of Kėdainiai District Municipality
Protected areas in Kėdainiai District Municipality